Sixteen is the fifth studio album by American singer Stacy Lattisaw. Released on July 11, 1983, by Cotillion Records, Lattisaw was 16 years old at the time of this release. The single, "Miracles", peaked at number thirteen on the U.S. R&B chart in 1983.

Track listing
 "16" – 6:22
 "Black Pumps and Pink Lipstick" – 4:48 	
 "I've Loved You Somewhere Before" – 3:57
 "Million Dollar Babe" – 5:15 	
 "What's So Hot 'Bout Bad Boys" (featuring Kathy Sledge) – 6:25 	
 "Johey!" – 5:17 	
 "The Ways of Love" – 5:12 	
 "Miracles" – 3:30

Personnel
Stacy Lattisaw – lead and backing vocals
Narada Michael Walden – drums, keyboards, percussion, piano
Randy Jackson – bass
David Sancious – keyboards, synthesizer
Corrado Rustici  – guitar
Preston Glass – percussion, backing vocals
Marc Russo – saxophone
Jim Gilstrap, Myrna Mathews, John Lehman, Angela Bofill, Carla Vaughn, Vicki Randle, Yolanda Glass – backing vocals

Charts

Singles

References

External links
 Stacy Lattisaw-Sixteen at Discogs

1983 albums
Stacy Lattisaw albums
Albums produced by Narada Michael Walden
Atlantic Records albums